Maloelap Airport is a public use airport located on Taroa Island in Maloelap Atoll, Marshall Islands. This airport is assigned the location identifier 3N1 by the FAA and MAV by the IATA.

Facilities 
Maloelap Airport is at an elevation of 4 feet (1.2 m) above mean sea level. The runway is designated 04/22 with a turf surface measuring 3,500 by 150 feet (1,067 x 46 m). There are no aircraft based at Maloelap.

History 
During World War II, Taroa Airfield was a major Japanese airbase approximately three miles long and one mile wide. The airfield was Japan's easternmost airbase of the War. Heavily bombed during the war, it was a favorite target for bombers from Makin Airfield, Tarawa and Abemama. Remnants of the airbase, defenses, and battles can still be found on the island; about 1,200 feet from the southwest end of the airport lies the wreck of the Toreshima Maru, a Japanese supply ship sunk in December 1943.

Airlines and destinations

See also
 Taroa Airfield

References

External links
AirNav airport information for 3N1

Airports in the Marshall Islands
Airport